Blue Cross Blue Shield of Michigan (BCBSM) is an independent licensee of Blue Cross Blue Shield Association.

Currently it is headquartered in 600 E. Lafayette Blvd. in downtown Detroit. Blue Cross Blue Shield of Michigan, a nonprofit organization, provides and administers health benefits to more than 4.3 million members residing in Michigan in addition to members of Michigan-headquartered groups who reside outside the state.

The worker's compensation insurance firm Accident Fund operates as a for-profit subsidiary of Blue Cross Blue Shield of Michigan.

In 2019, four Michigan addiction treatment facilities filed lawsuits against BCBSM for "unjustified slashing of payments" and "a high number of claims denials for substance use treatment. That same year Michigan Department of Health and Human Services planned on expanding the program to including additional assistance for the serious mentally ill in northern Michigan. The funds come from the Michigan Health Endowment Fund created in 2013 and requires Blue Cross Blue Shield of Michigan to contribute "up to $1.56 billion over 18 years to a health endowment fund that benefits Michigan residents".

References

External links

Financial services companies established in 1929
Medical and health organizations based in Michigan
Companies based in Detroit
Members of Blue Cross Blue Shield Association